Southern Voice may refer to:

Southern Voice (newspaper), an American LGBT newspaper
Southern Voice (album), an album by Tim McGraw
"Southern Voice" (song), its title track